The Warden's House at Penitentiary Blvd and West St. in McAlester, Oklahoma was listed on the National Register of Historic Places in 2005. It was designed by architect P.H. Weathers. It has also been known as Oklahoma State Penitentiary Warden's House. It is located across the street from the Oklahoma State Penitentiary.

References

Houses on the National Register of Historic Places in Oklahoma
Renaissance Revival architecture in Oklahoma
Mission Revival architecture in Oklahoma
Houses in Pittsburg County, Oklahoma
National Register of Historic Places in Pittsburg County, Oklahoma